Discoderes is a genus of beetles in the family Buprestidae, containing the following species:

 Discoderes salzmanni (Solier, 1833)
 Discoderes villiersi Descarpentries, 1952

References

Buprestidae genera